USS Sangamon (CVE-26) was a US Navy escort carrier of World War II.

Originally Esso Trenton , a  the T3 tanker oiler , built by the Federal Shipbuilding and Dry Dock Company, it was operated by Standard Oil of New Jersey on runs from gulf coast ports to the east coast. After entering service in the early part of the war in the Navy as a tanker, Sangamon was converted into an aircraft carrier.

After conversion Sangamon was at the Allied invasion of French North Africa in 1943 before moving to the war in the Pacific. Post war it was sold into civilian ownership and scrapped in 1960.

Service history 
Esso Trenton was  acquired by the United States Navy on 22 October 1940. Renamed Sangamon and designated a fleet oiler, one of 12  oilers, she was commissioned on 23 October 1940.

After service off the west coast and in Hawaiian waters, Sangamon shifted to the Atlantic Fleet in the spring of 1941, and through the Neutrality Patrol period, carried fuel from the gulf coast oil ports to bases on the east coast, in Canada, and in Iceland. On 7 December 1941, when the U.S. entered World War II, she was at Naval Station Argentia, Newfoundland, offloading her liquid cargo. Within the week, she started south again to renew her schedule on a tighter time frame.

In early 1942, she was designated for conversion to an auxiliary aircraft carrier. On 11 February, she arrived in Hampton Roads. Three days later, she was reclassified AVG-26; and on 25 February, she was decommissioned and conversion was begun at the Norfolk Navy Yard.

During the spring and summer, the need for auxiliary carriers, later called escort carriers, increased. Work on Sangamon, three other Cimarron-class oilers, and 20 C-3 merchant hulls was continued and sped up. In August, Sangamon – the first of her class of escort carriers – was ready. Her accommodations had been enlarged to house her increased complement and embarked aviation personnel, and her armament had been changed to two 5"/51 caliber guns, eight 40 mm guns, and twelve 20 mm cannons to increase her anti-aircraft defense. On 20 August, she was redesignated ACV-26; and five days later, she was recommissioned.

Sangamon and her three sister T3 conversions were considered very successful escort-carrier designs, larger and more stable than the smaller C3-derived ; additionally, they retained substantial oil bunkerage, useful in refueling destroyers in company. The late-war purpose-built  escort carriers were derived from the Sangamons.

Operation Torch 

Shakedown in Chesapeake Bay and off Bermuda followed a return to the yard for repair and improvements to her ventilation system, and on 25 October she sailed east with Task Force 34 (TF 34) to provide air cover for Operation Torch, the invasion of North Africa. Assigned to the Northern Support Force, she arrived off Port Lyautey on 8 November. Prior to and during the landings, and subsequent action, her air group, Composite Squadron 26 (VC-26) flew combat air patrol (CAP), anti-submarine patrol (ASP), and ground support missions. At mid-month, she got underway to return to Norfolk, Virginia, whence, after repairs, she sailed for Panama and the Pacific.

1943
By mid-January 1943, Sangamon had arrived at Éfaté, New Hebrides. As a unit of Carrier Division 22 (CarDiv 22), she operated in the New Caledonia—New Hebrides—Solomon Islands area for the next eight months.

Captain E. P. Moore took over as captain on 5 April 1943. Redesignated CVE-26 on 15 July 1943, Sangamon shifted her base of operations from Efate to Espiritu Santo in August, and, in September, she returned to the United States for an overhaul at Mare Island. There she received more modern equipment for her flight deck and a combat information center.

On 19 October, she departed San Diego with VC-37 embarked and sailed for Espiritu Santo. She got underway from the latter on 13 November, rendezvoused with Task Force 53 the next day, and on 20 October arrived in the Gilberts to support the assault on Tarawa Atoll. During the first two days of this operation, her planes struck enemy positions on the island. Then, through 6 December, they were sent out on CAP and ASP missions to protect the escort carrier group and the target area.

1944
The escort carrier then set course to return to San Diego. In early January 1944, she trained off southern California, and on 13 January sailed west. Steaming via Pearl Harbor, she pushed on toward her next amphibious operation, the assault on Kwajalein in the Marshall Islands.

At 16:51 on 25 January, during routine flight operations, a returning fighter failed to hook a wire on landing, broke through the barriers, and crashed into parked planes on the forward flight deck. Its belly tank, torn loose, skidded forward, spewing flaming fuel. Fire soon spread among the planes. It raged along the flight deck and flames beat up over the bridge, making ship control extremely difficult. The former oiler was turned out of the wind, so that the fire could be fought. By 16:59, it was under control. Seven of the crew died in those eight minutes. Seven others were seriously injured, and of the 15 who jumped over the side to escape the flames, 13 were picked up, two were missing.

Palaus
Temporary repairs were made at sea, and from 31 January to mid-February, Sangamon supported the assault and occupation of Kwajalein. She then moved on to Enewetak, where her planes covered the landing forces from 17 to 24 February. On the latter date, she departed the Marshalls and headed back to Pearl Harbor to complete repairs. Captain M. E. Browder flew aboard on 1 March to relieve Captain Moore and assume command.

On 15 March, the CVE got underway again. Departing Hawaii, she rendezvoused with Task Group 50.15 (TG 50.15) – the fast carrier force support group – on 26 March. For the remainder of the month and into April she escorted that group as it operated north of the Admiralty Islands to refuel and resupply the fast carrier force after it had conducted strikes on the Palaus. In early April, Sangamon retired to Espiritu Santo and at mid-month, sailed for New Guinea. Briefly attached to the 7th Fleet, she covered the landing at Aitape from 22 to 24 April; retired to Manus Island for two days, then returned to the Aitape area where she conducted patrols until 5 May.

Sangamon then returned to Espiritu Santo, whence she departed on 19 May. Rehearsals for the Marianas campaign followed, and on 2 June, she sailed for the Marshalls. Rendezvousing with TF 53 en route, she covered that force to Kwajalein, then to the Mariana Islands. From 17 to 20 June, she guarded the force as it steamed to the east of Saipan as a backup force for TF 52, which was then engaged in the assault on, and the occupation of, the island.

After the Battle of the Philippine Sea, Sangamon was detached from TF 53. On 21 June, she joined TF 52, and into July conducted operations in support of the occupation of Saipan. On 4 July, she steamed for Eniwetok; arrived on 7 July; and sortied again on 10 July. From 13 July – 1 August, she covered the bombardment groups engaged in the capture of Guam. On 4 August, she returned to Eniwetok, where on 9 August she proceeded to Manus where she was anchored for almost a month.

On 9 September, Sangamon departed Seeadler Harbor and steamed for Morotai. There, from 15 to 27 September, she again covered Allied assault forces. After the initial waves had landed, her planes shifted from combat support to bombing and strafing missions to destroy Japanese airfields on nearby Halmahera.

Philippines
Sangamon again anchored in Seeadler Harbor on 1 October. Twelve days later, she sortied with TG 77.4, the escort carrier group of the Leyte invasion force. That group, composed of 18 escort carriers, was broken down into Task Units 77.4.1, 77.4.2, and 77.4.3 (TU 77.4.1, 77.4.2, and 77.4.3), and referred to as "Taffy 1, 2, and 3", respectively. During the operation, they would steam to the east of Leyte Gulf: Taffy 1, including Sangamon, was off northern Mindanao, Taffy 2 off the entrance to Leyte Gulf; and Taffy 3 off Samar.

Prior to the 20 October landings on Leyte, Sangamon launched regular flights in support of the advance units of the invasion force and sent strikes against Leyte and Visayan airfields. On the 20th, her planes covered the landing forces and the ships in the transport areas. That day, she also came under enemy air attack and took a hit at the main deck level.

Enemy airfields again became Sangamons primary targets in the days immediately following the landings. On 24 October, however, her planes fought off waves of Japanese aircraft over the landing area. Early on 25 October, two flights took off: one toward the Mindanao Sea to locate and finish off Japanese survivors of the Battle of Surigao Strait, the other toward Leyte for CAP missions. About an hour later, Sangamon received word that Taffy 3,  to the north, had been attacked by the Japanese Center Force which had transited San Bernardino Strait during the night.

Battle off Samar

Within a half-hour, Sangamons CAP flight had been diverted to Samar and she had launched another smaller group to further aid the attacked unit. Soon thereafter, however, at about 07:40, as Taffy 1 planes were being recovered, rearmed, and launched, the unit became the target of the first strike of the kamikaze.

 took the first hit, and as her flight and hangar decks blazed, Suwannee was attacked. Antiaircraft fire from that CVE scored on the planes, which then dived toward Sangamon. A  shell from Suwannee finished one plane only  from Sangamon. By 07:55,  had joined the fight, and – as Santees crew brought her fires under control – sent a torpedo into that luckless CVE. Minutes later, Suwannee was hit by a Zero forward of the after elevator.

During the intense fighting, several of Sangamons crew were injured and one was killed by strafing fire. Later in the morning, as the attacks fell off, she sent medical personnel to assist casualties of the damaged ships, then began bringing them aboard for treatment. At mid-day, she suffered malfunctions in her steering gear, electric generators, and catapult, but repairs were completed in time for her to launch afternoon strikes as scheduled. Those flights gave chase to the retreating Japanese Center Force.

On 26 October, Sangamon recovered her scattered planes and again launched CAP flights. At 12:15, however, enemy planes were reported coming in from the north. Several broke through the air defenses, and Suwanee suffered another kamikaze hit. On 29 October, the escort carriers retired.

1945

Ryukyus
Sangamon returned to the United States for an overhaul at Bremerton, Washington that took from 30 November 1944 – 24 January 1945. During the overhall rocket stowage racks, a second catapult, improved radar gear, new 40 mm mounts, a bomb elevator, and additional fire-fighting equipment were installed. In mid-February Sangamon moved to Hawai to train a new squadron, VC-33, which included night fighters. On 16 March she arrived at Ulithi where she was temporarily detached from her division to join TU 52.1.1, one of the escort carrier groups assigned to the initial assault phase of Operation Iceberg, the invasion of the Ryukyu Islands.

On 21 March, Sangamon departed Ulithi with other ships assigned to the Kerama Retto assault force. Covering the force en route, she operated to the south of Okinawa and launched planes for CAP and landing force support as Kerama Retto was secured. On 1 April, as the landings on the Hagushi beaches of Okinawa were taking place, she shifted to TU 52.1.3, thus rejoining CarDiv 22.

From there, her planes raided airfields on Miyako and Ishigaki. Detached on 12 April, she again provided air support for the forces fighting on Okinawa, then covered the occupation of Ie-shima. On 18 April, she returned to Sakishima Islands. Dawn and dusk strikes were launched daily, and heckler flights were sent over the fields at night. On 22 April, eight fighters and four bombers of a dusk strike caught 25–30 enemy planes warming up on Nobara Field, central Miyako. Seven Nakajima Ki-43 "Oscars" attempted to intercept Sangamons planes, but the attack was pressed home. After the bombers delivering their loads, the fighters engaged the "Oscars" and shot down five. Night fighters from Sangamon were diverted to the area and arrived as four more Oscars joined the fight; two of the four were shot down.

Kamikaze

Through the end of the month, Sangamon continued to launch her planes to neutralize Japanese airfields. On 4 May, she put into Kerama Retto to rearm. Loading, frequently interrupted by the presence of bogies in the area, was not completed until evening. At 18:30, the CVE got underway. Land-based fighters were vectored out to intercept the enemy planes and shot down nine. One got through and, at about 19:00, began circling toward a position on Sangamons port quarter. The escort carrier went into a hard left turn to avoid the enemy and to maneuver into a position to launch her aircraft. She then opened fire and was joined by her escorts.

Other enemy aircraft followed the first. At 19:25, another broke through the interceptor screen, ran into clouds to avoid anti-aircraft fire, then came out and, with increased speed, headed for Sangamon. At 19:33, the kamikaze dropped his bomb and crashed into the center of the flight deck. The bomb and parts of the plane penetrated the deck and exploded below. Initial damage was extensive, fires broke out on the flight deck, the hangar deck, and in the fuel deck, communications from the bridge were lost within 15 minutes, and the ship was soon out of control.

The action of Sangamon swinging through the wind caused the flames and smoke to change direction, spreading the fires. By 20:15, however, steering control had been established, and the ship was brought back to a course which helped the crew fight the many fires. But water pressure was low, as the firemain and risers had ruptured. Carbon dioxide bottles were brought into action. Nearby ships came alongside to assist. By 22:30, all fires were under control. At 23:20, Sangamon – with 11 dead, 25 missing, and 21 seriously wounded – got underway to return to Kerama Retto for temporary repairs.

From Kerama Retto, Sangamon proceeded  via Ulithi and Pearl Harbor to Norfolk, Virginia, for repairs. Work was suspended with the cessation of hostilities in mid-August. She was decommissioned on 24 October and struck from the Naval Vessel Register on 1 November.

Fate
She was subsequently sold to Hillcone Steamship Company, San Francisco, and was delivered to that company's representative at Norfolk on 11 February 1948. She passed through multiple owners through the 1950s, and ultimately was scrapped in Osaka, Japan starting in August 1960.

Awards
Sangamon earned eight battle stars during World War II. Her three air groups were each awarded the Presidential Unit Citation.

Notes

References

External links
 navsource.org: USS Sangamon
 hazegray.org: USS Sangamon

Type T3-S2-A tankers
Ships built in Kearny, New Jersey
1939 ships
Merchant ships of the United States
Cimarron-class oilers (1939)
World War II auxiliary ships of the United States
World War II tankers of the United States
Sangamon-class escort carriers
World War II escort aircraft carriers of the United States
Maritime incidents in May 1945